Changchunxi West railway station is a railway station on the Harbin–Dalian section of the Beijing–Harbin High-Speed Railway, and the Changchun–Jilin Intercity Railway. It is in the western part of Changchun, Jilin province, China.

See also
Chinese Eastern Railway
South Manchuria Railway
South Manchuria Railway Zone
Changchun Light Rail Transit

References

Buildings and structures in Changchun
Buildings and structures in Jilin
Transport in Changchun
Transport in Jilin
Railway stations in Changchun
Railway stations in Jilin